Brujo (Spanish for "wizard") is a practitioner of Brujería.

Brujo or El Brujo may also refer to:

Places
El Brujo Peru
Chocoyero-El Brujo Natural Reserve in the municipality of Ticuantepe in the Managua department

People
Brujo (surname)
Juan Brujo
El Brujo (nickname)
 Amancio Amaro (born 1939), Spanish former footballer
 Manuel Fleitas Solich (1900–1984), Paraguayan football player and coach
 José López Rega (1916–1989), Argentina's Minister of Social Welfare
 Dámaso Rodríguez Martín (1945–1991), Spanish serial killer
 Ramiro Mendoza (born 1972), former Major League Baseball pitcher
 Juan Quarterone (born 1935), Argentine footballer
 Cuco Valoy (born 1937), Dominican singer

Plant
 Plectranthus amboinicus (redirect from Orégano brujo)

Sport
Guayama Wizards (redirect from Brujos de Guayama) basketball team based in Guayama, Puerto Rico

Music
Los Brujos band
Brujo (album) New Riders of the Purple Sage album

See also
El brujo (disambiguation)
El amor brujo (disambiguation)
Bewitching Kisses (redirect from Besos brujos) 1937 Argentine romantic drama film musical
Warlock of Chiloé (redirect from Brujo Chilote) semi-mythical characters in Chilote mythology and folklore